Bregano is a comune (municipality) in the Province of Varese in the Italian region Lombardy, located about  northwest of Milan and about  west of Varese.

Bregano borders the following municipalities: Bardello, Biandronno, Malgesso, Travedona-Monate.

Demographic evolution

References

Cities and towns in Lombardy